Little Ax may refer to:
Willmer "Little Ax" Broadnax (1916–1992), an American singer
Little Axe (born 1949), an American musician